"Ai o Suru Hito - Orochi's Theme" is Jun Shibata's 17th recut single. It was released on 17 September 2008 and peaked at #13. It was chosen as theme song for the movie Orochi, starring Yoshino Kimura.

Track listing
Ai o Suru Hito - Orochi's Theme (愛をする人; People Who Make Love)
Otou-san yori. (お父さんより。; From Dad.)

Charts

External links
https://web.archive.org/web/20161030094458/http://www.shibatajun.com/— Shibata Jun Official Website

2008 singles
Jun Shibata songs
Japanese film songs
2008 songs
Victor Entertainment singles
Song articles with missing songwriters